Les Éboulements is a municipality in the Capitale-Nationale region of Quebec, Canada.

Its population centres include Les Éboulements (located along Route 362 on the plateau overlooking the Saint Lawrence River), Éboulements-Est (at the feet of Mount Éboulements), Cap-aux-Oies, Sainte-Marie-de-Charlevoix, and Saint-Joseph-de-la-Rive ( on the shores of the Saint Lawrence facing Saint-Bernard-sur-Mer). Saint-Joseph-de-la-Rive, formerly known as Les Éboulements-en-Bas and Quai-des-Éboulements, is the departure point for ferries to L'Isle-aux-Coudres.

The municipality is member of the Association of Most Beautiful Villages of Quebec due to its country heritage and to the beautiful architecture and character of its houses.

Geography
Les Éboulements is located in the centre of the Charlevoix impact structure. Mount Éboulements (Mont des Éboulements), in the eastern part of the municipality, is considered the central rebound of the earth's crust following moments after the meteor impact some 350 million years ago.

Rivers within the municipality include the Boudreault and Seigneur Rivers, both small tributaries of the Saint Lawrence River.

History
In February 1663, a strong earthquake shook the Charlevoix region and triggered a large landslide down the slopes that characterize the hills of the area to the Saint Lawrence coast. Among the many eyewitnesses that testified to the significance of the event, Gabriel Lalement wrote: "near the Bay called St. Paul, there was a small mountain alongside the river, a quarter of a league in circumference, which was abyssed, and as if it had not done that dive, it came out of the bottom to change into an islet." Thereafter the area was known as les Éboulements (French for "the landslides").

On April 1, 1683, the Éboulements Seignory was granted to Pierre Lessard by Governor La Barre and Intendant de Meulles, having an area of 1¼ league wide by 2 leagues deep. In 1710, the seignory was acquired by Pierre Tremblay who really began its development and granted concessions to settlers arriving at the beginning of the 18th century. In 1732, the parish was founded.

In 1810, the seignory was sold to Pierre de Sales Laterrière. In 1845, the municipality was originally established as L'Assomption-de-Notre-Dame-des-Éboulements, but abolished two years later. In 1855, it was reestablished as L'Assomption-de-la-Sainte-Vierge, and in 1859, the seignorial system was abolished by the municipal council.

In 1931, the Village Municipality of Saint-Joseph-de-la-Rive was formed when it separated from the Municipality of L'Assomption-de-la-Sainte-Vierge. In 1956, the municipality was renamed to Les Éboulements. In 2001, Les Éboulements and Saint-Joseph-de-la-Rive were merged and formed the new Municipality of Les Éboulements.

On October 13, 1997, a bus travelling down the steep road to Saint-Joseph-de-la-Rive failed to slow down and negotiate a turn, crashed through the barriers and plunged over 10 meters into a ravine. This accident killed 44 persons, making it the deadliest road accident in Canadian history.

Rolling downhill the Route du Port in September 2008 the Guinness World Record for Street luge has been established at 157.41 km/h (97 mph).

Films
The community appears in the National Film Board of Canada's  films On the Sea (1960)  by René Bonnière and Pierre Perrault. and Terre de nos aïeux (1943) directed by Jane Marsh

Demographics
Population trend:
 population in 2021: 1465 {2016 to 2021 population change: 10.1%}
 population in 2016: 1331 {2011 to 2016 population change: 0.2%}
 Population in 2011: 1328 {2006 to 2011 population change: 5.1%}
 Population in 2006: 1264 {2001 to 2006 population change: 4.8%}
 Population total in 2001: 1249 {1996 to 2001 population change: 18.7%}
 Les Éboulements (Municipality): 1027
 Saint-Joseph-de-la-Rive (Village): 222
 Population total in 1996: 1217 {1991 to 1996 population change:-2.6%}
 Les Éboulements (Municipality): 1013
 Saint-Joseph-de-la-Rive (Village): 204
 Population total in 1991: 1238
 Les Éboulements (Municipality): 1013
 Saint-Joseph-de-la-Rive (Village): 225

Private dwellings occupied by usual residents: 643 (total dwellings: 925)

Mother tongue:
 French as first language: 97.3%
 English as first language: 0.3%
 English and French as first language: 0%
 Other as first language: 2.0%

See also 
Charlevoix tourist train

References

Incorporated places in Capitale-Nationale
Municipalities in Quebec